The Velindre Cancer Centre is a specialist facility caring for cancer patients in Whitchurch, Cardiff, Wales. It is managed by the Velindre University NHS Trust.

History
The facility was established as Velindre Hospital in 1956. The name is a corruption of Melin Tref. The first linear particle accelerator was installed in 1961.

The hospital became Velindre Cancer Centre in 1994 and a new radiotherapy unit opened in 2000.

A new Maggie's Centre, designed by Dow Jones Architects and funded by the Wales Government opened in 2019.

In July 2022, the comedian Rhod Gilbert, who is a patron of the centre, announced that he was being treated for cancer at the centre.

References

Hospitals in Cardiff
NHS hospitals in Wales
Hospital buildings completed in 1956
Hospitals established in 1956
Cancer hospitals
1956 establishments in Wales